"Teardrops" is a song co-written and recorded by American country music artist George Ducas.  t was released in September 1994 as the first single from his debut album George Ducas.  The song reached #38 on the Billboard Hot Country Singles & Tracks chart.  The song was written by Ducas and Terry McBride, whose band, McBride & the Ride, previously recorded it on their 1994 album Terry McBride & the Ride.

Chart performance

References

1994 debut singles
1994 songs
George Ducas (singer) songs
Songs written by George Ducas (singer)
Songs written by Terry McBride (musician)
McBride & the Ride songs
Liberty Records singles